Pedro Cieza de León (Llerena, Spain c. 1520 – Seville, Spain July 2, 1554) was a Spanish conquistador and chronicler of Peru and Popayán. He is known primarily for his history and description of Peru, Crónicas del Perú. He wrote this book in four parts, but only the first was published during his lifetime; the remaining sections were not published until the 19th and 20th centuries.

Early life
Cieza de León was born to a family of Jewish conversos around 1520 in Llerena, a town in southeastern Extremadura, less than 100 km (60 mi) from Portugal. Although recently converted from Judaism to Catholicism, the family enjoyed good social standing in the region because of their networks and business dealings.

His father, Lope de León, was a shopkeeper in the town, and his mother, Leonor de Cazalla, was a native of Llerena. There is scant documentary evidence of the young Cieza de León’s childhood, and little is known of his early life before his voyage to the Americas. Given the fact that he left home at 13, it is unlikely that Cieza de León received more than a rudimentary education.

In 1536, in Córdoba, at  16, Cieza de León was greatly surprised to learn of the discovery of the land of the Incas and so decided to go to Seville to embark on his journey to South America, to see for himself the artifacts of precious metals which had been brought to Spain from Cajamarca.

In light of the prohibition of entry into the Spanish colonies for Jews and Jewish converts to Catholicism, Alonso López and Luis de Torres attested for Cieza de León that he was not prohibited. Jewish converso Pedro López de Cazalla, secretary of Spanish conquistador Francisco Pizarro, conqueror of the Incan Empire, was also his first cousin..

In South America
Cieza de León participated in various expeditions and helped found a number of cities. These activities include the following:

 1536 and 1537: Expedition to San Sebastián de Buenavista and to Urute with Alonso de Cáceres.
 1539: Foundation of San Ana de los Caballeros (Popayán Province), with Jorge Robledo.
 1540: Foundation of Cartago (Popayán Province).
 1541: Foundation of Antioquía (Popayán Province).
 He took possession of an encomienda in Cartagena of Indies, which he granted to Sebastián de Belalcázar.
 1547: Cieza de León participated in missions headed by Pedro de la Gasca in support of the royalist campaign against Gonzalo Pizarro's rebellion.
 1548: He reached the "City of Kings" (present-day Lima), where he started his career as a writer and official chronicler of the New World. During the following two years he traveled across the Peruvian territory, collecting interesting information he would later use to develop his works.

Later life and the fate of his writings
Cieza de León returned to Seville, Spain, in 1551 and married a woman named Isabel López de Abreu. In this city he published, in 1553, the first part of the chronicles of Peru (Primera Parte). He died the following year, leaving the rest of his work unpublished. His Second Part of Chronicles of Peru, describing the Incas, was translated by Clements Markham and published in 1871. In 1909, the fourth part of his chronicle, focusing on the civil wars among the Spanish conquerors, was published under the title Third Book of the Peruvian Civil Wars. The third part of Cieza de León's Crónicas del Perú, which examined the discovery and conquest of Peru by the Spaniards, was considered by historians to be lost.  The document eventually turned up in a Vatican library, and historian Francesca Cantù published a Spanish version of the text in 1979.

Significance
Though his works are historical and narrate the events of the Spanish conquest of Peru and the civil wars among the Spaniards, much of their importance lies in his detailed descriptions of geography, ethnography, flora and fauna.  He was the first European to describe some native Peruvian animal species and vegetables.

Bibliography
Cieza de León, Pedro de.  The Second Part of the Chronicle of Peru, translated by Clements R. Markham.  London: Hakluyt Society, 1883. (reissued by Cambridge University Press, 2010. )
Cieza de León, Pedro de.  The Travels of Pedro de Cieza de León, AD 1532-50, Contained in the First Part of His Chronicle of Peru, translated by Clements R. Markham.  London: Hakluyt Society, 1883. (reissued by Cambridge University Press, 2010. )
Cieza de León, Pedro de.  The War of Las Salinas, translated by Clements R. Markham.  London: Hakluyt Society, 1923 (1883).
Cieza de León, Pedro de.  The War of Quito, translated by Clements R. Markham.  London: Hakluyt Society, 1913 (1883).
Cieza de León, Pedro de.  The War of Chupas, translated by Clements R. Markham.  London: Hakluyt Society, 1917 (1883).
Cieza de León, Pedro de.  The Incas of Pedro de Cieza de León, translated by Harriet de Onis.  Norman, OK: University of Oklahoma Press, 1959.
Cieza de León, Pedro de.  The Discovery and Conquest of Peru: Chronicles of the New World Encounter, edited and translated by Alexandra Parma Cook and Noble David Cook.  Durham, NC: Duke University Press, 1998.

Notes

External links

 
 

1520 births
1554 deaths
Historians of Peru
People from Campiña Sur (Badajoz)
Extremaduran conquistadors
Incan scholars
16th-century Spanish historians
Spanish people of Jewish descent
Conversos